Julia vs. Julia is a Mexican comedy television series produced by Nazareno P. Brancatto that aired on Las Estrellas from 30 April 2019 to 23 July 2019. The series stars Consuelo Duval as the titular character.

Plot 
Julia Montemayor managed to be at the height of fame, being one of the most famous television actresses. This is how she learned the privileges that success and fame grants. Later she is replaced by a younger woman, reason why she falls into decline and is fired. Julia never prepared for that as she never saved her money, she did not seek friendships, she did not have any relationships and, above all, she did not care for her family. Now, faced with the adversity of losing everything, she must remake her way of life. However, Julia is unpredictable and in trying to live in a normal world, she turns upside down the lives of her son, her assistant and her eccentric mother.

Cast 
 Consuelo Duval as Julia Montemayor
 Ruy Senderos as Jaime
 Liliana Abud as Carmen
 Alberto Garmassi as Samuel
 Alejandro Ávila as Emiliano
 Priscila Faz as Lucía
 Nailea Norvind as Isabel

Episodes

References

External links 
 

Las Estrellas original programming
Mexican television sitcoms
Television series by Televisa
2019 Mexican television series debuts
2019 Mexican television series endings
Spanish-language television shows